Ferried Naciri (born 12 February 1989) is a Belgian basketball coach. He has been an assistant and head coach for several clubs in Belgium, Denmark and the Netherlands. He is current an assistant coach for EWE Baskets Oldenburg of the German Basketball Bundesliga (BBL).

Coaching career
Naciri started coaching in 2004 with local youth teams.

In 2012, he was the assistant coach of the women's team of DBC Houthalen in the Belgian Women's League.

In 2013, he started his coaching career at Leuven Bears initially training youth teams and the second team. In 2014, Naciri was appointed as assistant coach.
In 2016, Naciri became the head coach of Leuven Bears in the Belgian Pro Basketball League.

Naciri signed with Aris Leeuwarden in the Netherlands for the 2019–20 season. He coached Aris to its first-ever NBB Cup final before the season was ended early because of the COVID-19 pandemic. After the 2020–21 season, he left Aris.

On July 21, 2022, he has signed with EWE Baskets Oldenburg of the Basketball Bundesliga (BBL) as an assistant coach.

References

1989 births
Aris Leeuwarden coaches
Belgian basketball coaches
Leuven Bears coaches
Living people
People from Mol, Belgium
Sportspeople from Antwerp Province